Breton (or  in Morbihan) is a Southwestern Brittonic language of the Celtic language family spoken in Brittany, part of modern-day France. It is the only Celtic language still widely in use on the European mainland, albeit as a member of the insular branch instead of the continental grouping.

Breton was brought from Great Britain to Armorica (the ancient name for the coastal region that includes the Brittany peninsula) by migrating Britons during the Early Middle Ages, making it an Insular Celtic language. Breton is most closely related to Cornish, another Southwestern Brittonic language. Welsh and the extinct Cumbric, both Western Brittonic languages, are more distantly related, and the Goidelic languages (Irish, Scottish Gaelic) have a slight connection due to both of their origins being from Insular Celtic.

Having declined from more than one million speakers around 1950 to about 200,000 in the first decade of the 21st century, Breton is classified as "severely endangered" by the UNESCO Atlas of the World's Languages in Danger. However, the number of children attending bilingual classes rose 33% between 2006 and 2012 to 14,709.



History and status

Breton is spoken in Lower Brittany, roughly to the west of a line linking Plouha (west of Saint-Brieuc) and La Roche-Bernard (east of Vannes). It comes from a Brittonic language community that once extended from Great Britain to Armorica (present-day Brittany) and had even established a toehold in Galicia (in present-day Spain). Old Breton is attested from the 9th century. It was the language of the upper classes until the 12th century, after which it became the language of commoners in Lower Brittany. The nobility, followed by the bourgeoisie, adopted French. The written language of the Duchy of Brittany was Latin, switching to French in the 15th century. There exists a limited tradition of Breton literature. Some philosophical and scientific terms in Modern Breton come from Old Breton. The recognized stages of the Breton language are: Old Breton – c.800 to c.1100, Middle Breton – c.1100 to c.1650, Modern Breton – c.1650 to present.

The French monarchy was not concerned with the minority languages of France, spoken by the lower classes, and required the use of French for government business as part of its policy of national unity. The revolutionaries assumed that reactionary and monarchist forces preferred regional languages to try to keep the peasant masses under-informed. In 1794, Bertrand Barère submitted his "report on the " to the Committee of Public Safety in which he said that "federalism and superstition speak Breton".

Since the 19th century, under the Third, Fourth and now Fifth Republics, the French government has attempted to stamp out minority languages—including Breton—in state schools, in an effort to build a national culture. Teachers humiliated students for using their regional languages, and such practices prevailed until the late 1960s.

In the early 21st century, due to the political centralization of France, the influence of the media, and the increasing mobility of people, only about 200,000 people are active speakers of Breton, a dramatic decline from more than 1 million in 1950. The majority of today's speakers are more than 60 years old, and Breton is now classified as an endangered language.

At the beginning of the 20th century, half of the population of Lower Brittany knew only Breton; the other half were bilingual. By 1950, there were only 100,000 monolingual Bretons, and this rapid decline has continued, with likely no monolingual speakers left today. A statistical survey in 1997 found around 300,000 speakers in Lower Brittany, of whom about 190,000 were aged 60 or older. Few 15- to 19-year-olds spoke Breton. In 1993, parents were finally legally allowed to give their children Breton names.

Revival efforts

In 1925, Professor Roparz Hemon founded the Breton-language review . During its 19-year run,  tried to raise the language to the level of a great international language. Its publication encouraged the creation of original literature in all genres, and proposed Breton translations of internationally recognized foreign works. In 1946,  replaced . Other Breton-language periodicals have been published, which established a fairly large body of literature for a minority language.

In 1977, Diwan schools were founded to teach Breton by immersion. Since their establishment, Diwan schools have provided fully immersive primary school and partially immersive secondary school instruction in Breton for thousands of students across Brittany. This has directly contributed to the growing numbers of school-age speakers of Breton.

The Asterix comic series has been translated into Breton. According to the comic, the Gaulish village where Asterix lives is in the Armorica peninsula, which is now Brittany. Some other popular comics have also been translated into Breton, including The Adventures of Tintin, Titeuf, Hägar the Horrible, Peanuts and Yakari.

Some original media are created in Breton. The sitcom, is in Breton. Radio Kerne, broadcasting from Finistère, has exclusively Breton programming. Some movies (Lancelot du Lac, Shakespeare in Love, Marion du Faouet, Sezneg) and TV series (Columbo, Perry Mason) have also been translated and broadcast in Breton. Poets, singers, linguists, and writers who have written in Breton, including Yann-Ber Kalloc'h, Roparz Hemon, Anjela Duval, Xavier de Langlais, Pêr-Jakez Helias, Youenn Gwernig, Glenmor, Vefa de Saint-Pierre and Alan Stivell are now known internationally.

Today, Breton is the only living Celtic language that is not recognized by a national government as an official or regional language.

The first Breton dictionary, the Catholicon, was also the first French dictionary. Edited by Jehan Lagadec in 1464, it was a trilingual work containing Breton, French and Latin. Today bilingual dictionaries have been published for Breton and languages including English, Dutch, German, Spanish and Welsh. A monolingual dictionary,  was published in 1995. The first edition contained about 10,000 words, and the second edition of 2001 contains 20,000 words.

Efforts include installing bilingual signs and posters for regional events, as well as encouraging the use of the Spilhennig to let speakers identify each other. The office also started an Internationalization and localization policy asking Google, Firefox and SPIP to develop their interfaces in Breton. In 2004, the Breton Wikipedia started, which now counts more than 75,000 articles. In March 2007, the  signed a tripartite agreement with Regional Council of Brittany and Microsoft for the consideration of the Breton language in Microsoft products.

France has twice chosen to enter the Eurovision Song Contest with songs in Breton; once in 1996 in Oslo with "" by Dan Ar Braz and the fifty piece band Héritage des Celtes, and most recently in 2022 in Turin with "" by Alvan Morvan Rosius and vocal trio Ahez. These are two of five times France has chosen songs in one of its minority languages for the contest, the others being in 1992 (bilingual French and Antillean Creole), 1993 (bilingual French and Corsican), and 2011 (Corsican).

Geographic distribution and dialects

Breton is spoken mainly in Lower Brittany, but also in a more dispersed way in Upper Brittany (where it is spoken alongside Gallo and French), and in areas around the world that have Breton emigrants.

The four traditional dialects of Breton correspond to medieval bishoprics rather than to linguistic divisions. There are no clear boundaries between the dialects because they form a dialect continuum, varying only slightly from one village to the next. , however, requires a little study to be intelligible with most of the other dialects.

Official status

Nation
As noted, only French is an official language of France. Supporters of Breton and other minority languages continue to argue for their recognition, and for their place in education, public schools, and public life.

Constitution
In July 2008, the legislature amended the French Constitution, adding article 75-1:  (the regional languages belong to the heritage of France).

The European Charter for Regional or Minority Languages, which obliges signatory states to recognize minority and regional languages, was signed by France in 1999 but has not been ratified. On 27 October 2015, the Senate rejected a draft constitutional law ratifying the charter.

Region
Regional and departmental authorities use Breton to a very limited extent. Some bilingual signage has also been installed, such as street name signs in Breton towns. One station of the Rennes metro system has signs in both French and Breton.

Under the French law known as Toubon, it is illegal for commercial signage to be in Breton alone. Signs must be bilingual or French only. Since commercial signage usually has limited physical space, most businesses have signs only in French.

, the Breton language agency, was set up in 1999 by the Brittany region to promote and develop the daily use of Breton. It helped to create the  campaign, to encourage enterprises, organisations and communes to promote the use of Breton, for example by installing bilingual signage or translating their websites into Breton.

Education

In the late 20th century, the French government considered incorporating the independent Breton-language immersion schools (called ) into the state education system. This action was blocked by the French Constitutional Council based on the 1994 amendment to the Constitution that establishes French as the language of the republic. Therefore, no other language may be used as a language of instruction in state schools. The Toubon Law implemented the amendment, asserting that French is the language of public education.

The Diwan schools were founded in Brittany in 1977 to teach Breton by immersion. Since their establishment, Diwan schools have provided fully immersive primary school and partially immersive secondary school instruction in Breton for thousands of students across Brittany. This has directly contributed to the growing numbers of school-age speakers of Breton. The schools have also gained fame from their high level of results in school exams, including those on French language and literature. Breton-language schools do not receive funding from the national government, though the Brittany Region may fund them.

("Awakening") was created in 1990 for bilingual education in the Catholic schools.

Statistics
In 2018, 18,337 pupils (about 2.00% of all pupils in Brittany) attended ,  and  schools, and their number has increased yearly. The goal of Jean-Yves Le Drian (president of the Regional Council) of 20,000, and of “their recognition” for “their place in education, public schools, and public life”, by 2010, was not achieved, but he describes being encouraged by their progress.

In 2007, some 4,500 to 5,000 adults followed such a Breton language course as an evening or correspondence one. The transmission of Breton in 1999 is estimated to be 3 percent.

Municipalities

Other forms of education
In addition to bilingual education (including Breton-medium education) the region has introduced the Breton language in primary education, mainly in the department of Finistère. These "initiation" sessions are generally one to three hours per week, and consist of songs and games.

Schools in secondary education ( and ) offer some courses in Breton. In 2010, nearly 5,000 students in Brittany were reported to be taking this option. Additionally, the University of Rennes 2 has a Breton language department offering courses in the language along with a master's degree in Breton and Celtic Studies.

Phonology

Vowels
Vowels in Breton may be short or long. All unstressed vowels are short; stressed vowels can be short or long (vowel lengths are not noted in usual orthographies as they are implicit in the phonology of particular dialects, and not all dialects pronounce stressed vowels as long). An emergence of a schwa sound occurs as a result of vowel neutralization in post-tonic position, among different dialects.

All vowels can also be nasalized, which is noted by appending an 'n' letter after the base vowel, or by adding a combining tilde above the vowel (most commonly and easily done for a and o due to the Portuguese letters), or more commonly by non-ambiguously appending an  letter after the base vowel (this depends on the orthographic variant).

Consonants

 The pronunciation of the letter  varies nowadays:  is used in the French-influenced standard language and, generally speaking, in the central parts of Lower Brittany (including the south of Trégor, the west of Vannetais and virtually all parts of Cornouaille) whereas  is the common realisation in Léon and often in the Haut-Vannetais dialect of central Morbihan (in and around the city of Vannes and the Pays de Pontivy), though in rapid speech mostly a tapped  occurs. In the other regions of Trégor  or even  may be found.
Most of the Breton dialects do not inherit the sound and thus it is mostly not orthographically fixed. The Peurunvan, for instance, uses  for both mutations, which are regularly and more prominently pronounced  in Léonais, Cornouaillais, Trégorrois and Bas-Vannetais. In traditional literature written in the Vannetais dialect, two different graphemes are employed for representing the dental fricative, depending on the scripture's historical period. There once was a time when  was used to transcribe the sound, but today mostly the regular  is instead used, and this practice can be traced back to at least the end of the 17th century. The area this phenomenon has been found to be evident in encompasses the towns of Pontivy and Baud and surrounding smaller villages like Cléguérec, Noyal-Pontivy, Pluméliau, St. Allouestre, St. Barthélemy, Pluvigner and also parts of Belle-Île. The only known place where the mutation occurs outside of the Vannes country is the Île de Sein, an island located off Finistère's coast. Some scholars also used  as the symbol for the sound to indicate that it was rather an "infra-dental" consonant than a clear interdental, which is the sound the symbol  is usually describes. Other linguists, however, did not draw that distinction, either because they identified the sound to actually be an interdental fricative (such as Roparz Hemon in his phonetic transcription of the dialect used in Pluméliau or Joseph Loth in his material about the dialect of Sauzon in Belle-Île) or due to the fact that they attached no importance to it and ascertained that their descriptions were not in need of a further clarification of the sound's phonetic realisation as it was a clearly distinguishable phoneme.
 The digraph zh represents a variable sound that may exhibit as /s/, /z/, or /h/, and descends from a now-extinct sound , which is still extant in Welsh as th.

Grammar

Nouns
Breton nouns are marked for gender and number. While Breton gender is fairly typical of gender systems across western Europe (with the exception of Basque and modern English), Breton number markers demonstrate rarer behaviors.

Gender
Breton has two genders: masculine and feminine, having largely lost its historic neuter as has also occurred in the other Celtic languages as well as across the Romance languages. Certain suffixes (-ach/-aj, -(a)dur, -er, -lec'h, -our, -ti, -va) are masculine, while others (-enti, -er, -ez, -ezh, -ezon, -i, -eg, -ell, and the singulative -enn) are feminine.  The suffix -eg can be masculine or feminine.

There are certain non-determinant factors that influence gender assignment. Biological sex is applied for animate referents. Metals, time divisions (except for  "hour",  "night" and  "week") and mountains tend to be masculine, while rivers, cities and countries tend to be feminine.

However, gender assignment to certain words often varies between dialects.

Number
Number in Breton is primarily based on an opposition between singular and plural. However, the system is full of complexities in how this distinction is realized.

Although modern Breton has lost its ancestral dual number marker, relics of its use are preserved in various nouns pertaining to body parts, including the words for eyes, ears, cheeks, legs, armpits, arms, hands, knees, thighs, and wings. The dual is no longer productive, and has merely been lexicalized in these cases rather than remaining a part of Breton grammar.

Like other Brythonic languages, Breton has a singulative suffix that is used to form singulars out of collective nouns, for which the morphologically less complex form is the plural. Thus, the singulative of the collective  "mice" is  "mouse". However, Breton goes beyond Welsh in the complications of this system.

On top of this, the formation of plurals is complicated by two different pluralizing functions. The "default" plural formation is contrasted with another formation which is said to "emphasize variety or diversity" – thus two semantically different plurals can be formed out of :  "parks" and  "various different parks". Ball reports that the latter pluralizer is used only for inanimate nouns. Certain formations have been lexicalized to have meanings other than that which might be predicted solely from the morphology:  "water" pluralized forms  which means not "waters" but instead "rivers", while  now has come to mean "running waters after a storm".

Meanwhile certain nouns can form doubly marked plurals with lexicalized meanings –  "child" is pluralized once into  "children" and then pluralized a second time to make  "groups of children".

The diminutive suffix  also has the somewhat unusual property of triggering double marking of the plural:  means "little child", but the doubly pluralized  means "little children";  boat has a singular diminutive  and a simple plural , thus its diminutive plural is the doubly pluralized .

As seen elsewhere in many Celtic languages, the formation of the plural can be hard to predict, being determined by a mix of semantic, morphological and lexical factors.

However in some dialects the use of this affix has become rare.

Another set of nouns have lexicalized plurals that bear little if any resemblance to their singulars. These include  "girl" → ,  "pig" → ,  "cow" → , and  "dog" → .

In compound nouns, the head noun, which usually comes first, is pluralized.

Verbal aspect
As in other Celtic languages as well as English, a variety of verbal constructions is available to express grammatical aspect, for example: showing a distinction between progressive and habitual actions:

Inflected prepositions
As in other modern Celtic languages, Breton pronouns are fused into preceding prepositions to produce a sort of inflected preposition. Below are some examples in Breton, Cornish, Welsh, Irish, Scottish Gaelic, and Manx, along with English translations.

Note that in the examples above the Goidelic languages (Irish, Scottish Gaelic, and Manx) use the preposition meaning at to show possession, whereas the Brittonic languages use with. The Goidelic languages, however, do use the preposition with to express "belong to" (Irish , Scottish , Manx , The book belongs to me).

The Welsh examples are in literary Welsh. The order and preposition may differ slightly in colloquial Welsh (Formal , North Wales , South Wales ).

Initial consonant mutations

Breton has four initial consonant mutations: though modern Breton lost the nasal mutation of Welsh (but for rare words such the word "door": "dor" "an nor"), it also has a "hard" mutation, in which voiced stops become voiceless, and a "mixed" mutation, which is a mixture of hard and soft mutations.

Word order

Normal word order, like the other Insular Celtic languages, is at its core VSO (verb-subject-object), which is most apparent in embedded clauses. However, Breton finite verbs in main clauses are additionally subject to V2 word order in which the finite main clause verb is typically the second element in the sentence. That makes it perfectly possible to put the subject or the object at the beginning of the sentence, largely depending on the focus of the speaker. The following options are possible (all with a little difference in meaning):

the first places the verbal infinitive in initial position (as in (1)), followed by the auxiliary  'to do'.
the second places the Auxiliary verb  'to be' in initial position (as in (2)), followed the Subject, and the construction  + infinitive. At the end comes the Object. This construction is an exception to verb-second.
the third places the construction  + infinitive in the initial position (as in (3)), followed by the Auxiliary verb , the Subject, and the Object.
the fourth option places the Object in initial position (as in (4)), followed by an inflected verb, followed by the Subject.
the fifth, and originally least common, places the Subject in initial position (as in (5)), followed by an inflected verb, followed by the Object, just like in English (SVO).

Vocabulary

Breton uses much more borrowed vocabulary than its relatives further north; by some estimates a full 40% of its core vocabulary consists of loans from French.

Orthography
The first extant Breton texts, contained in the Leyde manuscript, were written at the end of the 8th century: 50 years prior to the Strasbourg Oaths, considered to be the earliest example of French. Like many medieval orthographies, Old- and Middle Breton orthography was at first not standardised, and the spelling of a particular word varied at authors' discretion. In 1499, however, the Catholicon, was published; as the first dictionary written for both French and Breton, it became a point of reference on how to transcribe the language.

As phonetic and phonological differences between the dialects began to magnify, many regions, particularly the Vannes country, began to devise their own orthographies. Many of these orthographies were more closely related to the French model, albeit with some modifications.

In the 1830s Jean-François Le Gonidec created a modern phonetic system for the language.

During the early years of the 20th century, a group of writers known as  elaborated and reformed Le Gonidec's system. This KLT orthography was established in 1911. At the same time writers of the more divergent Vannetais dialect developed a phonetic system also based on that of Le Gonidec.

Following proposals made during the 1920s, the KLT and Vannetais orthographies were merged in 1941 to create an orthographic system to represent all four dialects.

In 1955 François Falc'hun and the group Emgleo Breiz proposed a new orthography. It was designed to use a set of graphemes closer to the conventions of French. This  ("University Orthography", known in Breton as ) was given official recognition by the French authorities as the "official orthography of Breton in French education." It was opposed in the region and today is used only by the magazine  and the publishing house Emgléo Breiz.

This system is based on the derivation of the words.

Today the majority of writers continue to use the Peurunvan orthography, and it is the version taught in most Breton-language schools.

Alphabet
Breton is written in the Latin script. Peurunvan, the most commonly used orthography, consists of the following letters:

 a, b, ch, c'h, d, e, f, g, h, i, j, k, l, m, n, o, p, r, s, t, u, v, w, y, z

The circumflex, grave accent, trema and tilde appear on some letters. These diacritics are used in the following way:

 â, ê, î, ô, û, ù, ü, ñ

Differences between the two systems are particularly noticeable in word endings. In Peurunvan, final obstruents, which are devoiced in absolute final position and voiced in sandhi before voiced sounds, are represented by a grapheme that indicates a voiceless sound. In OU they are written as voiced but represented as voiceless before suffixes:  (big),  (bigger).

In addition, Peurunvan maintains the KLT convention, which distinguishes noun/adjective pairs by nouns written with a final voiced consonant and adjectives with a voiceless one. No distinction is made in pronunciation, e.g.  Breton language vs.  Breton (adj).

Some examples of words in the different orthographies:

Pronunciation of the Breton alphabet

Notes:
  Vocative particle:  O Brittany!
  Word-initially.
  Word-finally.
  Unwritten lenition of ch, c'h, f, s and spirantization of p > f .
  Unstressed vowels e, eu, o are pronounced  in Leoneg but  in the other dialects. The pronunciation  appears mainly in front of clusters lc'h, rc'h (less often also before c'h), before semivowels , before other clusters beginning with r, l and before rr.
Instead of  also  may appear.
  In Gwenedeg word-final g and k is palatalized to [c] after preceding i.
  But before a vowel other than i the digraph ni is written instead of gn, e.g.  to drive', radical , 1PS preterite , 3PS preterite .
  But mute in words such as ha(g), he(c'h), ho(c'h), holl, hon/hor/hol. Silent in Gwenedeg and Leoneg.
  Group ilh is pronounced  when it follows a vowel, following a consonant the group is pronounced [iʎ]. But before a vowel other than i li is written instead of ilh, e.g.  to follow, radical , 1PS preterite , 3PS preterite . In some regions instead of  may appear pronunciation .
  Word-finally following a cluster of unvoiced consonants.
  In front of k, g.
  The digraph ou is realized same as the letter w when preceded or followed by a vowel (or when between vowels), but in words such as Doue, douar, gouarn the digraph ou is pronounced .
  The digraph où marks plural ending. Its pronunciation varies throughout Brittany:  rating geographically from Northwest Leon to Southeast Gwened.
The pronunciation  is retained word-finally in verbs. Word-finally following r, l, n, z it is pronounced .
  But mute in words such as gouez, bloaz, goaz, ruziañ, kleiz, rakdïazezañ, bezañ, Roazhon, dezhañ, kouezhañ, 'z, az, ez, da'z, gwirionez, enep(g)wirionez, moneiz, falsvoneiz, karantez, kengarantez, nevez, nevezc'hanet, nadozioù, abardaez, gwez, bemdez, kriz, bleiz, morvleiz, dezhi . Z is generally mute in Kerneweg, Tregerieg and Gwenedeg, but in Leoneg z(h) is always pronounced.
  Used to distinguish words stêr river, hêr heir, kêr town (written also kaer) from ster sense, her bold, ker dear.
  Used to distinguish trôad circuit/tour from troad foot.
  In northern dialects (mainly in Leoneg), there is a tendency to voice c'h between vowels. Pronunciation  appears also in forms of lenition of g, c'h and mixed mutation of g.
  In Gwenedeg unstressed e often .
  Lenited varieties of r, l, n may appear word-initially in case of soft mutation.
  In Leoneg  in front of a nasal.
  In Leoneg w in front of e, i .
  In Leoneg gwr .
  Before a vowel.
  Forms of the indefinite article.
 A conservative realisation of the initial mutation of d and t, used in certain parts of the Vannes country.

Examples

Lord's Prayer

 Hon Tad,
 c'hwi hag a zo en Neñv,
 ra vo santelaet hoc'h anv.
 Ra zeuio ho Rouantelezh.
 Ra vo graet ho youl war an douar evel en neñv.
 Roit dimp hiziv bara hor bevañs.
 Distaolit dimp hon dleoù
 evel m'hor bo ivez distaolet d'hon dleourion.
 Ha n'hon lezit ket da vont gant an temptadur,
 met hon dieubit eus an Droug.

Words and phrases in Breton

Visitors to Brittany may encounter words and phrases (especially on signs and posters) such as the following:

Language comparison

Borrowing from Breton by other languages
The English words  and  have been borrowed from French, which took them from Breton. Dolmen is a misconstructed word (it should be ). The Cornish surnames Mennear, Minear and Manhire all derive from the Cornish   ("long stone"), as does  "settlement by the long stone".

The French word  ("large seagull") is derived from Breton , which shares the same root as English "gull" (Welsh , Cornish ).

See also
 Armoricani
 Gaelic revival, Irish language revival
 Julian Maunoir, 17th-century Breton language orthographer
 List of Celtic-language media
  an association promoting the language

References
Notes

Further reading
Overviews
 

 
Historical development
 Hemon, Roparz. A Historical Morphology and Syntax of Breton. Dublin: Dublin Institute for Advanced Studies, 1975.
 
 
 
 
Grammars and handbooks
 
 
 Favereau, Francis. Grammaire du breton contemporain. Morlaix: Skol Vreizh, 1997.
 Hemon, Roparz. Breton Grammar, 3rd edn. Trans. & rev'd by Michael Everson. Westport: Evertype, 2011.
 
 McKenna, Malachy. A handbook of modern spoken Breton. Tübingen: Max Niemeyer, 1988 (repr. 2015).
  (repr. 2011).
 Press, Ian & Hervé Le Bihan. Colloquial Breton: the complete course for beginners. London: Routledge, 2004 (repr. 2007, 2015).

External links

 Ofis Publik ar Brezhoneg official website.
 , the public Breton TV channel.
 : an essay about the situation of the Breton language.
 
 : news in Breton.
 : Brittany information, articles about Breton.
 .
 .

Dictionaries
 English online dictionary and grammar for Breton
 A multilingual dictionary containing many Breton words alongside those of other languages

Learning
 Breton site including online lessons
 Audio CD, workbooks, software in English to learn Breton
 Breton site with learners' forum and lessons (mostly in French with some English)
 Jouitteau, M. Grammaire du breton, (extensive Breton grammar in French, with glossed examples and typological comparisons), IKER, CNRS, 2009 > 2017].

Bible
 Ar Bibl Santel (Jenkins) 1897 (JEN1897). History of Bible translation in Breton and Breton Bible

 
Languages attested from the 9th century
Southwestern Brittonic languages

History of Brittany
Endangered Celtic languages
Languages of France
Verb–subject–object languages
Severely endangered languages